GLH may refer to:
 Dodge Omni (GLH)
 Gallaher Group, a British tobacco company
 Glasshoughton railway station, in England
 GLH Hotels, a British-based global hotel company
 Gomez and López-Hernández syndrome
 Mid Delta Regional Airport, in Mississippi, United States
 Northwest Pashayi language